The Kamoro language is an Asmat–Kamoro language spoken in New Guinea by approximately 8,000 people. Dialect diversity is notable, and Kamoro should perhaps not be considered a single language.

Varieties
'Dialects' are as follows.

 Yamur (far west around Yamur Lake and Etna Bay)
 Western (Japakòparè, Kéàkwa and Umari Rivers, 450 speakers in 1953)
 Tarjà (Opa River, 500 speakers in 1953)
 Middle (Wàkia river to the upper Mimika River, 4,300 speakers in 1953)
 Kàmora (Kàmora River, 400 speakers in 1953)
 Wània (Wània River 1,300 speakers in 1953)
 Mukumùga (Mukumùga river, 800 speakers in 1953)

References

Bibliography
 Moseley, Christopher and R. E. Asher, ed. Atlas of the World's Languages (New York: Routledge, 1994) p. 110

Asmat-Kamoro languages
Languages of western New Guinea